William Abraham is the name of:

 William Abraham (Irish politician) (1840–1915), Irish Parliamentary Party Member of Parliament in the British House of Commons
 William Abraham (trade unionist) (1842–1922), Welsh Liberal-Labour Member of Parliament for the Rhondda, 1885–1920
 William J. Abraham (born 1947), Northern Irish United Methodist pastor and theologian
 Sir William Ernest Victor Abraham (1897–1980), British general
 William Abraham (bishop) (1792–1837), Roman Catholic Bishop of Waterford and Lismore
 William Emmanuel Abraham (born 1934), Ghanaian philosopher
 William James Abraham (1883–1927), British trade unionist and politician